Rozhdestvensky (masculine) or Rozhdestvenskaya (feminine) is a Russian last name. It is shared by the following people:
Anatoly Konstantinovich Rozhdestvensky (1920–1983), Soviet paleontologist
Gennady Rozhdestvensky (1931–2018), Russian musical conductor
Natalya Rozhdestvenskaya (1900–1997), Russian soprano
Robert Rozhdestvensky (1932–1994), Soviet/Russian poet
Valery Rozhdestvensky (1939–2011), Soviet cosmonaut
Vsevolod Rozhdestvensky (1895–1977), Russian/Soviet poet
Yuri Rozhdestvensky (1926–1999), Soviet linguist
Zoya Rozhdestvenskaya (1906–1953), Soviet singer

See also
Zinovy Rozhestvensky (1848–1909), Russian admiral